Semigorye is the name of several rural localities in Russia:
Semigorye, Ivanovo Oblast, a village in Vichugsky District of Ivanovo Oblast; 
Semigorye, Vologda Oblast, a village in Kipelovsky Selsoviet of Vologodsky District in Vologda Oblast